Cristina Bermúdez (pronunciation: [kristina beɾmudeθ]) ( 982-Cornellana, 1051/1067), was an infanta of León, daughter of King Bermudo II and his first wife Queen Velasquita Ramírez. On her father's side, her grandparents were Ordoño III and Queen Urraca Fernández, daughter of count Fernán González of Castile. Her grandparents on her mother's side were most probably Count Ramiro Menéndez and his wife Adosinda Gutiérrez, both members of the highest Galaico-Portuguese nobility.

When her father King Bermudo repudiated his first wife and married Elvira García, with whom he had King Alfonso V of León and the infantas Teresa and Sancha Bermúdez, Cristina left the court in the city of León with her mother and settled in Asturias.

Marriage and issue
Shortly after 1000 and before 1016, Cristina married Ordoño Ramírez, son of Ramiro III of León and most likely Sancha Gómez. From this marriage, probably encouraged and planned by Queen Velasquita and the widowed Queen Teresa Ansúrez, both living in the Monastery of San Pelayo in Oviedo, descends the lineage of the Ordoñez, the most important in Asturias during the 11th century. Rodrigo Jiménez de Rada in his chronicle on King Bermudo II mentions "...with Velasquita he had Infanta Cristina; this Cristina with Ordoño 'the Blind', son of King Ramiro, was the mother of Alfonso, Ordoño, countess Pelaya and Aldonza", information which coincides with the names of her children as found in the charters of several monasteries in Asturias, including the Monastery of the Holy Savior in Cornellana, the Monastery of San Juan Bautista de Corias and the Cathedral of Oviedo. These were Alfonso, Aldonza, Ordoño and Pelaya Órdoñez, also known as Doña Palla.

Her last years 

Infanta Cristina was already a widow in 1024, as she states, when she made a donation for the founding of the Monastery of Cornellana. She died between 1051 — when she litigated with the Cathedral of Oviedo for the court of Santa Cruz de Aquilone that her mother Velasquita had "on loan" — and 1067 when her daughter Aldonza, also engaged in legal proceedings to have the cathedral grant her the same court. She was probably buried at the monastery which she founded and where she had become a nun.

Years later, Count Suero Vermúdez, son of Bermudo Ovéquiz and grandson of her daughter Aldonza Ordóñez, bought all the shares held by family members, donated the monastery to the Abbey of Cluny, but later reversed the donation and gave it to the Cathedral of Oviedo.

Notes

References

Bibliography 
 
 
 
 

Spanish princesses
Leonese infantas
10th-century people from the Kingdom of León
10th-century Spanish women
11th-century people from the Kingdom of León
11th-century Spanish nuns